The Singing Forest is a 2003 American romantic fantasy film written, produced, and directed by Jorge Ameer and starring Jon Sherrin, Erin Leigh Price, and Craig Pinkston. The film received negative reviews.

Plot
Christopher is a widower after his wife of 22 years, Savannah, dies. He begins drinking and becomes obsessed with the theory of past lives. Before long, he is convinced he is actually the reincarnation of a German resistance fighter (Jo) who was hanged by the Nazis for hiding Jews during The Holocaust. His situation becomes even more complex as his daughter Destiny's wedding approaches, and Christopher's sense of déjà vu around her fiancé, Ben, is enough to convince him that he and Ben were gay lovers during a past life. As Christopher becomes increasingly disturbed and goes about seducing his daughter's future husband, he begins to reveal the strange, violent path his life had taken well before his wife died. Ben gives in to Christopher's seduction and eventually visits Christopher's psychic to confirm he really was Jo's lover Alexander in a past life. Destiny discovers their affair and eventually gives them her blessing. In the end, she gives her father away at the church wedding that was originally supposed to be hers. The psychic reveals that Destiny had never really existed. Instead, she had been the spirit of a miscarriage Savannah had after she was raped. The spirit had always been destined to bring Christopher (Jo) and Ben (Alexander) back together in their present lives.

Production
The film was written and conceived in Torino, Milan, Firenze and Rome (all in Italy). The Torino Film Festival advised and assisted the producers in the making of the film.

Many of the minor film roles were performed by members of the production crew. For example, Louis Perez (the pastor) accounted for grip / electric. Sal Roman (Stephen), too, is credited as grip. Dustin Lance Black is credited as L. Black for his editing and as Lance Black for his acting role (Bill). He is mentioned for the third time within the special thanks section of the credits. Renea Plant (television host) was art director and Gregory Saites (Nazi guard #4) was stunt coordinator to the film.

Keith Holland was first assistant cinematographer and Sam Tyler Wayman is credited as first assistant director. Smitty Smith was boom operator / swing for the film. Andy Sowerwine was sound mixer. Still photography was done by Alistaire. Make up was done by Julia Santana and Christine Edwards. Wedding wardrobe was provided by Maria Roybal and B'B's Tuxido, the filming equipment was available by Ultravision Hollywood. Jon Jacobs was casting consultant.

The music partly consists of classical pieces performed by Jose Herring:
 Creation
 Adagio
 Piano Sonata No. 5 (Beethoven)
 Moonlight Sonata – Piano Sonata No. 14 (Beethoven)

The soundtrack also includes several modern songs:
 Crazy People, Crazy World (composed and produced by Earthman and Judy Gray)
  (produced by Ranato Serio, Maurizio Fabrizio, and Claudio Guidetti)

The original Holocaust photographs shown in the film were taken from the 1960 German educational documentary film The Yellow Star: The Persecution of the Jews in Europe 1933-45 (orig. Der gelbe Stern – Die Judenverfolgung 1933–1945) by Gerhard Schoenberner.

Cast
 John Sherrin as Christopher
 David Guzzone as young Christopher
 Erin Leigh Price as Destiny
 Craig Pinkston as Ben / Alexander
 Eric Morris as Jo
 Shelley Price as Savannah
 Jorge Ameer as Charlie
 Lance Black as Bill
 Sal Roman as Stephen
 Toni Zobel as psychic
 Marc Ambrose as Nazi guard
 Randal Craig as Nazi guard
 Nolo Ortiz as Nazi guard
 Justin Huddleston as Nazi guard
 Gregory Saites as Nazi guard
 Emre Ozpirincci as Holocaust victim
 Skyler Thomas as Holocaust victim
 Lisa Marx as television guest
 Renae Plant as television host
 Louis Perez as pastor
 Jean Carol as Emily
 Gerry Rand as Fred
 Colin Campbell as Heinz

Reception
The Singing Forest has a rare 0% rating on Rotten Tomatoes, based on 9 reviews. It also has a rare 1/100 rating on Metacritic, based on 7 reviews and is on their list of worst reviewed films. Reviewing the film in The New York Times, Stephen Holden wrote, "The Singing Forest was written and directed by Jorge Ameer, whose film Strippers opened three years ago and remained the single worst movie I had ever reviewed — until now."

See also
 List of films considered the worst

References

External links
 
 
 

2003 films
2000s romantic fantasy films
American independent films
American LGBT-related films
Films about reincarnation
American romantic fantasy films
Films about the aftermath of the Holocaust
LGBT-related drama films
2003 LGBT-related films
2000s English-language films
2000s American films